Carlos Averhoff (December 6, 1947 – December 23, 2016) was a Cuban jazz musician primarily known for playing tenor saxophone. He has been called "Carlos Averhoff 'Sax'". He was lastly based in Miami, Florida. He was born in Matanzas, and in Cuba initially had classical training. In 1973 he replaced Paquito D'Rivera at the "Orquesta Cubana de Música Moderna (OCMM)" as the government had declared him "reactionary." He was also involved in Timba music. His son Carlos Averhoff, Jr "Sax" is also a musician. Averhoff died at the age of 69 in Miami, Florida in 2016.

Teaching career
Averhoff has been Professor of Music at Florida International University School of Music in Miami, Florida. He also served as Professor of Saxophone at Miami-Dade College. In this position he has taught hundreds of saxophonists, many who have gone on to become teachers in their own right. His students teach and perform in teaching and performing positions throughout the world.

His students include:
Miguel Villafruela
Luis Nubiola
Carlos Averhoff Jr.

Web sources

1947 births
2016 deaths
Jazz tenor saxophonists
Irakere members
Cuban emigrants to the United States
20th-century saxophonists